The 2019 Liberty Flames football team represented Liberty University in the 2019 NCAA Division I FBS football season. They were led by first-year head coach Hugh Freeze and played their home games at Williams Stadium.

Previous season
In 2018, the Flames went 6–6. It was their first season as an FBS team. Head coach Turner Gill retired at the end of the season. The team completed their final year of postseason ineligibility due to the transition from FCS to NCAA Division I FBS.

Schedule

Sources:

Personnel

Coaching staff

Game summaries

Syracuse

at Louisiana

Buffalo

Hampton

New Mexico

at New Mexico State

Maine

at Rutgers

at UMass

at BYU

at Virginia

New Mexico State

vs. Georgia Southern (Cure Bowl)

Players drafted into the NFL

References

Liberty
Liberty Flames football seasons
Cure Bowl champion seasons
Liberty Flames football